Micronet Co. Ltd. is a software development company with its head office set in Sapporo,
Hokkaido, Japan. Previously specializing in 2D and 3D video games, the company has since focused on graphical website production as well as founding the 3D CG Soft System, 3D Atelier.

History
First established in October 1982, opening at sixty-four million yen, the company first got involved in the PC gaming industry developing a variety of games including platformer, wrestling, and Mahjong and other board games for the MSX and FM7.

They made their first start to making games for home consoles as well as establishing American game distributions with the Sega Genesis from 1989 to 1992. Micronet developed games for Sega consoles as well as Super Famicom and PlayStation games, mostly for Japan. Some of their games were notable for being hybrid games, a combination of two different game genres such as Helicoid and Heavy Nova

However, after the discontinuation of the Dreamcast, Micronet stopped game development and focused entirely on 3D graphic development instead. Their current focus is on developing 3D software, namely the computer design tool 3D Atelier.

Subsidiaries
Micronet has established two subsidiaries outside Japan. The first is Micronet Software Manila, established in April 1992 in Makati, Philippines. Much like the main company, Micronet Software Manila focused on game software development, but moved on to the development of computer multimedia and IT content.

The second subsidiary is Bignet USA Inc, San Francisco, California, July 1990. Bignet acted as Micronet’s US distributor of video games from 1991 to 1993.

Games
Helicoid (1985)
Robo Wrestle 2001-Toshi (sometimes Robo Wres 2001) (1987)
Gaban (1988)
Mahjong Gibai Special (1988)
Gokudou Jintori (1989)
Outlaw Suikoden (1989)
Tanba (1989)
Curse (1989)
Mahjong Jidai Special Part II (1990)
Junction (1990)
Warrior of Rome (1991)
Heavy Nova (1991)
Warrior of Rome II (1992)
Black Hole Assault (1992)
The Third World War (1993)
A/X-101 (1994)
Revengers of Vengeance/Battle Fantasy (1994)
Deadalus/Robotica: The Cybernetic Revolution (1995)
Gotha: Ishmalia War (1995)
Heir of Zendor (JP: Gotha II: Tenkuu no Kishi) (1996)
EOS: Edge of Skyhigh (1997)
Gotha World (1997)
Virtual Mahjong (1998)
Virtual Mahjong II (1998)
Marionette Handler (2000)
Marionette Handler 2 (2000)

Published
Flicky (1986)
Raiden Trad (1993)
Riddick Bowe Boxing (1993)

External links
 Official website
 Complete List of Games

Amusement companies of Japan
Video game companies of Japan
Video game development companies
Video game publishers
Japanese companies established in 1982